Raymond Edward McElroy (born July 31, 1972) is a former professional American football cornerback who played for six seasons for the Indianapolis Colts, the Chicago Bears, and the Detroit Lions in the  National Football League.  Attended Proviso West High School from 1987–1990. Ray now works to share his story and experiences around the country.

Ray recently appeared on the MTV show "Made" as a personal football coach for a choirboy hoping to improve his relationship with his football-obsessed father. "Original Air Date: 01-26-11"

References

1972 births
Living people
People from Bellwood, Illinois
Sportspeople from Cook County, Illinois
Players of American football from Illinois
American football cornerbacks
Eastern Illinois Panthers football players
Indianapolis Colts players
Chicago Bears players
Detroit Lions players